"El Destino"  is a song by Mexican singer Juan Gabriel and Spanish songstress Rocío Dúrcal from their collaboration album Juntos Otra Vez. It was released as the lead single from the album on 31 March 1997. "El Destino" was nominated in the category of Pop Song of the Year at the 10th Annual Lo Nuestro Awards in 1998, but lost to "Si Tú Supieras" by Alejandro Fernández. The track won Song of the Year on the Pop/Ballad field at the 1998 ASCAP Latin Awards.

Charts

Weekly charts

Year-end charts

See also
Billboard Top Latin Songs Year-End Chart
List of number-one Billboard Hot Latin Tracks of 1997

References

1997 songs
1997 singles
Juan Gabriel songs
Rocío Dúrcal songs
Songs written by Juan Gabriel
1990s ballads
Male–female vocal duets